A list of fantasy films released in the 1940s.

List

1940s
Lists of 1940s films by genre